The 1968 Supercopa de Campeones Intercontinentales was a knock-out association football competition between the South American winners of the Intercontinental Cup up to 1968. Three teams competed in a league system, playing each other twice, and Brazilian club Santos won the trophy.

Eligible clubs

Results

Matches

Scorers

3 goals
 Pedro Rocha (Peñarol)
 Wálter Machado da Silva (Racing)

2 goals
 Toninho Guerreiro (Santos)

1 goal
 Polo Carrera (Peñarol)
 Clodoaldo (Santos)
 Edú (Santos)
 Negreiros (Santos)
 Pelé (Santos)
 Alberto Spencer (Peñarol)

Own goals
 Alfio Basile (Racing; for Peñarol)
 José Ramos Delgado (Santos; for Peñarol)

References

1968 in South American football
1969 in South American football
1968 in Argentine football
1968 in Brazilian football
1968 in Uruguayan football
1969 in Argentine football
1969 in Brazilian football
1969 in Uruguayan football